August Immanuel Bekker (21 May 17857 June 1871) was a German philologist and critic.

Biography
Born in Berlin, Bekker completed his classical education at the University of Halle under Friedrich August Wolf, who considered him as his most promising pupil. In 1810 he was appointed professor of philosophy in the University of Berlin. For several years, between 1810 and 1821, he travelled in France, Italy, England and parts of Germany, examining classical manuscripts and gathering materials for his great editorial labours. 

Some of the fruits of his researches were published in the Anecdota Graeca (3 vols, 1814–1821), but the major results are to be found in the enormous array of classical authors edited by him. Anything like a complete list of his works would occupy too much space, but it may be said that his industry extended to nearly the whole of Greek literature with the exception of the tragedians and lyric poets. His best known editions are those of Plato (1816–1823), Oratores Attici (1823–1824), Aristotle (1831–1836), Aristophanes (1829), and twenty-five volumes of the Corpus Scriptorum Historiae Byzantinae. The only Latin authors edited by him were Livy (1829–1830) and Tacitus (1831).

Bekker confined himself entirely to manuscript investigations and textual criticism; he contributed little to the extension of other types of scholarship. Bekker numbers have become the standard way of referring to the works of Aristotle and the Corpus Aristotelicum. He was elected a Foreign Honorary Member of the American Academy of Arts and Sciences in 1861. He died in Berlin aged 86.

Works
 Ducas, Michael, Ducae : Michaelis Ducae Nepotis Historia Byzantina, ed. by Bekker, August Immanuel (Bonn: Weber, 1834).
 Khoniátis, Nikítas, Narrattive of Events after the Capture of the City [by the Franks], ed. by Bekker, August Immanuel (Bonn:  Weber, 1835).
 Phrantzis, G., Chronicon, ed. by Bekker, August Immanuel (Bonn:  Weber, 1838).
 Khalkokondhýlis, ‘Laónikos' (i.e. Nikólaos), De Origine et Rebus Gestis Turcarum, ed. by Bekker, August Immanuel (Bonn:  Weber, 1843).
 Attaleiátis, Michael, Historia, ed. by Bekker, August Immanuel (Bonn:  Weber, 1853).

Notes

References
  Endnotes:
 H. Sauppe, Zur Erinnerung an Meineke und Bekker (1872); 
 M. Haupt, “Gedächtnisrede auf Meineke und Bekker”, in his Opuscula, iii.;
 Ernst Immanuel Bekker, “Zur Erinnerung an meinen Vater”, in the Preußische Jahrbücher, vol. 29 (Berlin 1872).

Further reading
 Apollonii Dyscoli de Pronomine liber, ed. I. Bekker, Berolini 1813.
 Apollonii Alexandrini de Constructione Orationis libri quatuor ex rec. I. Bekkeri, Berolini 1817.
 Aristotelis Opera edidit Academia Regia Borussica, Berlin, 1831–1870. (5 volumes).

External links
 
 Guide to the Immanuel Bekker Papers 1806–1853 at the University of Chicago Special Collections Research Center

1785 births
1871 deaths
Writers from Berlin
German philologists
German scholars of ancient Greek philosophy
Members of the Prussian Academy of Sciences
Recipients of the Pour le Mérite (civil class)
People from the Margraviate of Brandenburg
University of Halle alumni
Academic staff of the Humboldt University of Berlin
Fellows of the American Academy of Arts and Sciences
German male non-fiction writers
German classical philologists
German Byzantinists
Scholars of Byzantine literature
Members of the Göttingen Academy of Sciences and Humanities